The Northern Suburbs Devils, or North Brisbane Devils, or often simply referred to as Norths for short, are a rugby league club representing the northern suburbs of Brisbane, Australia. The team colours are sky blue, navy blue and gold. They play in the Queensland Wizard Cup, and, through their predecessors, are one of the oldest clubs in Australia.
Norths have won 14 A Grade, 17 Reserve Grade and 14 Colts/Third Grade Premierships. They hold the record for most consecutive first grade Brisbane Rugby League premierships, winning six in a row between 1959 and 1964.

History

Before rugby league
The first incarnation of Northern Suburbs was the Past Grammars Rugby Union club, which was formed in 1891 as a separate Old Boys football club for Brisbane Grammar School.It shouldn't be confused with the school team known as Past & Present Grammar (made up of students, teachers & past students) which competed from 1888 to 1890. The club was quite successful in its early years, winning premierships in 1892, 1898 and 1899, as well as 1914. Wallaby captain Bob McCowan was a Past Grammar player when he led the national side in 1899.

Switch to rugby league
Following the disbandment of club rugby union in Brisbane towards the end of the First World War, Past Grammars, along with Christian Brothers and University, joined the Rugby Football League in 1920

From Past Grammars RLFC to Norths
Past Grammars, also known as Grammar Norths, won their first premiership in 1927, before becoming Northern Suburbs, following the introduction of District Football by the Brisbane Rugby League in 1933.

Post-war
In 1959 Clive Churchill (the little master) captain-coached Brisbane Rugby League club Norths to a premiership, his training methods were carried on by Bob Bax who coached Northern Suburbs RLFC to become the first club in BRL history to win three consecutive first grade premierships when they defeated Fortitude Valley 29–5 in the 1961 grand final in front of a then-record club crowd of 19,824 at Lang Park. Norths continued to dominate the decade with 7 grand final wins in 8 appearances. It would be another 11 years before they tasted success again.

Norths' Queensland representative player Nick Geiger was selected as the Australia national team's hooker in the final of the 1977 Rugby League World Cup tournament.

1990s

In the 1990s, along with many other Queensland clubs, Norths suffered heavily financially. Eventually it came to the stage that in 1998 they became a feeder club with National Rugby League newcomers, the Melbourne Storm, which attracted much needed finance, as well as some quality players, as well as securing the Devils' future. Also in 1998, the club won its first First Grade premiership since 1980, beating Wests in the Grand Final.

2000s
In the 2006 NRL Grand Final Melbourne's 17 man team had 13 players who had played with Norths in past years, including Matt Geyer, who won a Premiership with the Devils in 1998 and Melbourne in 1999. In the 2006 Tri-Nations series, 4 Norths players graduated to the Australian Kangaroos squad and 2 players, via Melbourne Storm, represented New Zealand Kiwis.

In 2008 the Devils signed a partnership agreement with the Brisbane Broncos which sees developing Broncos players train with and compete for the Devils in the Intrust Super Cup.

In 2018 Rohan Smith was recruited to be the Head Coach of the club. In 2019 he led the Devils to the finals, with the team falling agonizingly short of progressing past the first round.

Home grounds
For many years Norths played out of Oxenham Park in Nundah, but they moved to their current home ground, Albert Bishop Park, in 1969. Commonly referred to simply as 'Bishop Park', it borders the Schulz Canal in Nundah, and is named after club stalwart Albert Bishop, MBE. Norths has a licensed Leagues Club, Norths Leagues, at Bishop Park, as well as a second licensed Club at Anzac Avenue, Kallangur, further north of Brisbane.

Season summaries

BRL (1920–1995)

Queensland Cup 

Source:

Notable players 

 Clive Churchill
 Nick Geiger
 Cooper Cronk
 Israel Folau
 Matt Gillett
 Greg Inglis
 Joe Kilroy
 Tyrone Roberts
 Andrew McCullough 
 Shane Perry
 Mark Protheroe
 Billy Slater
 Cameron Smith 
 Kevin Walters
 Steve Walters
 Jharal Yow Yeh

Greatest Team
On 16 August 2008 in the year of the Centenary of Rugby League, Norths Devils announced their greatest team ever. The team is made up of players in their entire 75-year tenure.

Harry Bates
Fonda Metassa
Jack Reardon
Henry Hegarty
Joe Kilroy
Bill Pearson
Jack Stapleton
Vic Rudd
Cameron Smith
Lloyd Weier
Trevor Gillmeister
Mark Graham
Edward "Babe" Collins
Mark Murray
Greg Inglis
Greg Conescu
Ian Massie

Coach:
Bob Bax

Manager:
Albert Bishop

Sponsors 

 Brisbane Broncos
 Norths Leagues Club
 Norths Leagues and Services Club
 EMU Sportswear
 Ladbrokes
 Nova 106.9
 Minelab
 Black and White Cabs
 Monaghan Signs
 Jack Purcell Meats
 Powerade
 SRJ Walker Wayland
 Sgfleet
 Toyota
 Again Faster
 National Australia Bank
 National Storage
 eCarz.com.au
 Queensland Clubs Management
 Versace Timbers
 Keidin Electrical
 Castlemaine XXXX
 55Comms
 Samios
 Sirromet
 Clayfields Markets Fresh

See also

National Rugby League reserves affiliations

References

External links
northsdevils.com
northsdevilsrlfc.com

 
Rugby clubs established in 1891
1891 establishments in Australia
Rugby league teams in Brisbane